Balch House may refer to:

John Balch House, Beverly, Massachusetts
Oscar B. Balch House, Oak Park, Illinois
Balch House (Cincinnati, Ohio), Cincinnati, Ohio